Austin Savage (born 15 February 1940) is a British field hockey player. He competed in the men's tournament at the 1972 Summer Olympics.

References

External links
 

1940 births
Living people
British male field hockey players
Olympic field hockey players of Great Britain
Field hockey players at the 1972 Summer Olympics
Sportspeople from St Asaph